"The Scientist" is a song by British  rock band Coldplay. The song was written collaboratively by all the band members for their second album, A Rush of Blood to the Head. It is built around a piano ballad, with lyrics telling the story about a man's desire to love and an apology. The song was released in the United Kingdom on 11 November 2002 as the second single from A Rush of Blood to the Head and reached number 10 in the UK Charts. It was released in the United States on 15 April 2003 as the third single and reached number 18 on the US Billboard Modern Rock Tracks chart and number 34 on the Adult Top 40 chart.

Critics were highly positive towards "The Scientist" and praised the song's piano riff and Chris Martin's falsetto. Several remixes of the track exist, and its riff has been widely sampled. The single's music video won three MTV Video Music Awards, for the video's use of reverse narrative. The song was also featured on the band's 2003 live album Live 2003 and has been a permanent fixture in the band's live set lists since 2002.

Background
Lead singer Chris Martin wrote "The Scientist" after listening to George Harrison's All Things Must Pass. In an interview with Rolling Stone, Martin revealed that while working on the band's second album, A Rush of Blood to the Head, he knew that the album was missing something. One night, during a stay in Liverpool, Martin found an old piano that was out of tune. He wanted to work on Harrison's song, "Isn't It a Pity", but he could not manage to do so. When the song came to Martin, he asked that the recorder be turned on. He concluded by saying that he came across this chord sequence and noted that the chord was "lovely". Martin recorded the vocals and piano takes in a studio in Liverpool.

When asked about the development of the song, during a track-by-track reveal, Martin said: "That's just about girls. It's weird that whatever else is on your mind, whether it's the downfall of global economics or terrible environmental troubles, the thing that always gets you most is when you fancy someone." The liner notes from A Rush of Blood to the Head, on the other hand, states that "The Scientist is Dan", a reference to Dan Keeling, the A&R man who signed the band to Parlophone.

Composition

"The Scientist" is a melancholic, piano-driven ballad written in the key of F major. The lyrics to the song allude to a man's powerlessness in the face of love. It begins with the main four-chord piano melody created by lead singer Chris Martin, then joined by the first verses. He is then accompanied by the rest of the band after the first chorus. In addition to the main piano melody, the music of the song is created by a string arrangement, harmony, acoustic guitar, with its rhythm being slow tempo drums and bass guitar riffs. After the second chorus, Jonny Buckland plays an electric guitar riff.

Release

Coldplay released "The Scientist" in the United Kingdom on 11 November 2002 as the album's second single. The single was pressed with two B-sides: "1.36" and "I Ran Away." While preparing for the song as the album's second release, the band's US label felt the song failed to "provide enough of a blood rush for American listeners"; instead, they released "Clocks" as the second single in the US. The song was released on 15 April 2003 in the US.

In Australia, "The Scientist" was released as a CD single on 27 October 2003. The song appeared on Australian Singles Chart at number 40 on 1 November 2003. It appeared on Billboard's Modern Rock Tracks at number 18. The song peaked at number sixteen at Canada Singles Chart. The song peaked at number 10 in UK Top 75 on 17 November 2002.

The single's cover image was created by Norwegian photographer Sølve Sundsbø. Sundsbø originally created the image that would later be used as the cover art of A Rush of Blood to the Head for the fashion magazine Dazed and Confused, in the late 1990s. As with the album's other singles, "The Scientist"'s cover art features a black and white 3D scan of one of the band members, in this case drummer Will Champion.

Reception
"The Scientist" received widespread critical acclaim. Rob Sheffield of Rolling Stone Magazine, in his review of the album, wrote: "The fantastic piano ballad 'The Scientist' ... [has] a cataclysmic falsetto finale that could raise every hair on the back of your neck." Nick Southall of Stylus magazine wrote: "The piano that chimes through 'The Scientist' is captured perfectly, the warm depression of each individual key caught rather than a shrill ringing as is so often the case." Ian Watson of NME wrote: "'The Scientist' is a song inexorably linked with the endless night sky and the secret hopes and regrets of a hundred thousand strangers." In October 2011, NME placed it at number 37 on its list "150 Best Tracks of the Past 15 Years". In 2009, Rolling Stone ranked it number 54 on its "100 Best Songs of the Decade" list. In 2018, the same magazine placed the track at #50 in their "100 Greatest Songs of the Century" list. In 2019, Billboard ranked the song number five on their list of the 50 greatest Coldplay songs, and in 2021, American Songwriter ranked the song number six on their list of the 10 greatest Coldplay songs.

Rankings

Other versions 
"The Scientist" has been featured on two of Coldplay's live albums, Live 2003 (2003) and Live in Buenos Aires (2018). The song was covered live by Aimee Mann and released on a special edition of her album Lost in Space. Natasha Bedingfield, Alex Band, Eamon, and Avril Lavigne covered the song on Jo Whiley's Live Lounge radio show. Also, Belinda Carlisle did a live rendition on the ITV1 reality show Hit Me Baby One More Time. The British female quartet All Angels did a choral arrangement of the song on their album Into Paradise which was released in 2007. The chords to this song are replicated by Sum 41 in their song "Pieces." In addition, the American television show MADtv did a parody of the video, called "The Narcissist." Coldplay's original version plus a cover of the track performed by Johnette Napolitano and Danny Lohner were featured in the 2004 film Wicker Park. Allison Iraheta and Kris Allen performed an acoustic duet of the song at Oprah Winfrey's "No Phone Zone" rally in Los Angeles.

In 2011, Willie Nelson covered the song for a Chipotle Mexican Grill-sponsored short film titled Back to the Start, highlighting the problems of concentrated animal feeding operations. It also appears as the final track on his 2012 album Heroes. Nelson's version plays during the closing credits of the 2014 film The Judge. The song was used on 23 May 2011 episode of WWE Raw in a tribute video to wrestler "Macho Man" Randy Savage who had died three days earlier. The song was performed in the Glee episode "The Break Up" on 4 October 2012 by Cory Monteith, Darren Criss, Naya Rivera, Matthew Morrison, Lea Michele, Chris Colfer, Heather Morris and Jayma Mays. In 2014, Miley Cyrus covered the song at selected stops of her Bangerz Tour. Corinne Bailey Rae covered "The Scientist" for the soundtrack to the 2017 film Fifty Shades Darker. Conor Maynard covers a few verses of the song in the acoustic rendition of "Are You Sure?", with Kris Kross Amsterdam and Ty Dolla Sign. The bluegrass group The Petersens covered the song in 2020.  In 2021 Zucchero Fornaciari covered the song for his first cover album Discover.

Music video

The music video for "The Scientist" was notable for its distinctive reverse narrative, which employed reverse motion. The same concept had been previously used for Spike Jonze's 1995 music video for The Pharcyde's "Drop". The reverse-motion style had first been seen in 1989 for the video for the song "The Second Summer of Love" by Scottish band Danny Wilson. In order for Martin to appear to be singing the lyrics in the reversed footage, he had to learn to sing the song backwards, which took him a month. The video was filmed at various locations, including London and at Bourne Woods in Surrey, before the first leg of the A Rush of Blood to the Head tour. It was directed by Jamie Thraves. The video was shot between 30 September and 3 October 2002, premiering on 14 October.

The video opens on Martin lying on a mattress. Martin is shown, in reverse motion, wandering through a variety of locations before falling on the mattress. After the second chorus, Martin is shown getting out of his car in the woods and an unconscious woman is shown, and it is revealed that Martin and the woman were involved in a car accident; the passenger went flying through the windshield because she was not wearing her seatbelt. Irish actress Elaine Cassidy portrays the female passenger.

In 2003, "The Scientist" won multiple MTV Video Music Awards for Best Group Video, Best Direction, and Breakthrough Video. It was also nominated at the 2004 Grammy Awards for Best Short Form Music Video but lost to Johnny Cash's video for "Hurt".

On the 20th anniversary of A Rush of Blood to the Head, the band released a new version of the video in 4K resolution, which was restored and re-graded from the original 35 mm film.

Track listing

 "1.36" features Tim Wheeler of Ash on guitar.

Personnel
 Chris Martin – lead vocals, piano
 Jonny Buckland – guitar, acoustic guitar 
 Guy Berryman – bass guitar
 Will Champion – drums, percussion, backing vocals
 Audrey Riley - string arrangement

Charts and certifications

Weekly charts

Year-end charts

Certifications

References

External links
 
 

2002 singles
2002 songs
Coldplay songs
Parlophone singles
Capitol Records singles
2000s ballads
Rock ballads
Willie Nelson songs
Song recordings produced by Ken Nelson (British record producer)
Songs written by Guy Berryman
Songs written by Jonny Buckland
Songs written by Will Champion
Songs written by Chris Martin
MTV Video Music Award for Best Direction
Songs about science